The 2014 Hawaii Senate elections took place as part of the biennial United States elections. Hawaii voters elected state senators in 14 of the state senate's 25 districts. State senators serve four-year terms in the Hawaii Senate.

The primary election took place on August 9, 2014. The general election also took place on November 4, 2014.

Election results

Source for primary results. Source for General election results.

District 1

District 3

District 4

District 5

District 6

District 7 

General election
Incumbent Democrat J. Kalani English was automatically reelected without opposition, with no votes recorded.

District 12

District 16 

General election
Democrat Breene Harimoto was automatically reelected without opposition, with no votes recorded.

District 17

District 18

District 21 

Nonpartisan candidate Ruth A. Brown was not on the ballot for the general election.

District 23

District 24

References

Senate
Hawaii Senate elections
Hawaii Senate